Platydytes is a genus of beetles in the family Dytiscidae, containing the following species:

 Platydytes coarctaticollis (Régimbart, 1894)
 Platydytes cooperae Biström, 1988
 Platydytes incognitus Biström, 1988
 Platydytes inspectatus (Omer-Cooper, 1959)

References

Dytiscidae